The 1905 German football championship Final decided the winner of the 1905 German football championship, the 2nd edition of the German football championship, a knockout football cup competition contested by the regional league winners to determine the national champions. The match was played on 11 June 1905 at the Weidenpescher Park in Cologne. Union 92 Berlin won the match 2–0 against Karlsruher FV for their 1st German title.

Route to the final
The German football championship was an eleven team single-elimination knockout cup competition, featuring the champions of the regional football associations. There were a total of five rounds leading up to the final. For all matches, the winner after 90 minutes advances. If still tied, extra time was used to determine the winner.

Note: In all results below, the score of the finalist is given first.

Match

Details

References

1905
1904–05 in German football
Blau-Weiß 1890 Berlin matches
Karlsruher FV matches
Sports competitions in Cologne
June 1905 sports events
20th century in Cologne